Jason Wolfe (born 18 October 1994 in Mount Vernon, Ohio) is an American racing driver. Wolfe previously competed in single seater series such as the USF2000 championship. Currently, Wolfe competes in the German-based ADAC TCR Germany Touring Car Championship.

Racing career

Single seater career
In karting, Wolfe won the Yamaha Junior class with the Midstate Ohio Kart Club in 2009. Wolfe started single seaters in the SCCA Formula Enterprises class in 2010. The young driver finished second in the Great Lakes Division championship, behind the very experienced Scott Rettich. With these results, Wofle qualified for the SCCA National Championship Runoffs at Road America. The Ohio native finished in fourteenth place with his JAY Motorsports run car. For 2011 Wolfe competed in the SCCA Pro Formula Enterprises series finishing on the podium at Virginia International Raceway and Mid-Ohio Sports Car Course. Wolfe ended the championship third in the series standings, behind Rettich and Patrick Gallagher.

In 2012 Wolfe made his USF2000 debut at the 2012 U.S. F2000 Winterfest. His best result was a tenth place at Sebring. During the regular season, his best result was an eighth-place finish in the streets of Baltimore. First racing with JAY Motorsports, Wolfe switched to Pabst Racing for the 2013 U.S. F2000 Winterfest and regular season. Tõnis Kasemets joined Wolfe as his engineer scoring a third place at Mid-Ohio.

Pirelli World Challenge
Racing with Kinetic Motorsports Wolfe joined the Pirelli World Challenge TCA class racing a Kia Forte Coupe. Wolfe won five races during the season claiming the title in his debut season. Shea Holbrook finished second in points. Wolfe defended his title in 2015 remaining with Kinetic Motorsports. Looking for sponsors Wolfe ran a partial 2016 season winning a number of races. As he ran a limited schedule he could not defend his TCA title. Wolfe also won one race in the GTS class racing a GT4-spec KTM X-Bow.

ADAC TCR Germany Touring Car Championship
Looking for a better touring car racing option Wolfe moved to Europe. Joining Engstler Motorsport Wolfe raced one of the teams Volkswagen Golf cars. The young American scored his first victory after Niels Langeveld received a thirty-second penalty in the first race at Zandvoort. Wolfe scored his second podium of the season in the second race at Zandvoort.

Motorsports results

SCCA National Championship Runoffs

American Open-Wheel racing results
(key) (Races in bold indicate pole position, races in italics indicate fastest race lap)

SCCA Pro Formula Enterprises

USF2000 National Championship

References

1994 births
Living people
U.S. F2000 National Championship drivers
Formula Ford drivers
SCCA National Championship Runoffs participants
Racing drivers from Ohio
People from Mount Vernon, Ohio
24H Series drivers
Engstler Motorsport drivers